Leptopus chinensis is a species of plant belonging to the family Phyllanthaceae.

It is native to Caucasus to Northern Iran, Northern Pakistan, China to Northern Myanmar.

Synonym:
 Andrachne colchica Fisch. & C.A.Mey. ex Boiss.

References

Phyllanthaceae
Taxa named by Alexander von Bunge